Blenda is a Swedish opera in four acts by Per August Ölander to a libretto by Ernst Wallmark and Ludvig Josephson after the latter's play of the same name.

See also
 Blenda, heroine of a Swedish legend

References

1876 operas
Swedish-language operas
Operas set in Sweden
Operas based on plays
Operas set in the 17th century
Operas